George Leornard Keith (December 27, 1924 – March 9, 2012) was a Canadian politician. He served in the Legislative Assembly of New Brunswick as member of the Progressive Conservative party from 1957 to 1963.

References

1924 births
2012 deaths
20th-century Canadian politicians
Progressive Conservative Party of New Brunswick MLAs
Politicians from Saint John, New Brunswick